Atakor volcanic field ("Atakor" in Tuareg means "swollen part, knot at the end of something") is a volcanic field in Algeria. It lies in the Hoggar mountains and consists of a variety of volcanic features such as lava flows and about 450 individual vents which create a spectacular scenery.

Atakor is one of several large volcanic fields in this mountain range, which sits atop of a domal uplift and has erupted basalt, trachyte and phonolite. Volcanism in Atakor took place in several different phases, beginning 20 million years ago and continuing into the Holocene. Presently there is fumarolic activity.

Geography and geomorphology 

The field lies in the Hoggar and the terrain approaches elevations of  although the volcanics form an only superficial cover. The ground has a desert-like appearance. The scenery of the volcanic field is considered to be spectacular, with the lava domes and volcanic necks rising above the surrounding terrain.

Wadis diverge from the Atakor volcanic field; some of them reached Lake Chad in the past, others continued through the Grand Erg Oriental towards Chott Melrhir.

There are about 450 recent volcanic centres, of which about 400 are lava domes and 50 small stratovolcanoes, the latter of which include many recent cones which are accompanied by lava flows whose length reaches . Among the older volcanoes of Atakor are the peaks Assekrem and Tahat, the latter of which is the highest summit in the Hoggar. Some of these volcanoes have craters, including double craters, and others are eroded to the point that only volcanic necks remain, while lava domes include shapes from steep pillars to short stubby lava flows and are responsible for much of the field's scenery. Some of these lava domes and necks penetrated older basaltic layers. It has also erupted volcanic ash, lapilli and slag.

Geology 

A low-seismic velocity anomaly underpins the Atakor volcanic field in the mantle but does not appear to reflect the existence of a hotspot.

The basement crops out in deeply incised valleys, which in general appear to be younger than the Hoggar volcanism. Active faults occur throughout the region. 

Atakor has erupted basalts, phonolite and trachyte, the latter two form lava domes. The basalts are characterized by alkali basalts and basanite and form about 80% of all volcanic rocks in Atakor, with less important occurrences of benmoreite, hawaiite, mugearite and rhyolite. Phenocrysts in some volcanic rocks include amphibole, clinopyroxene, olivine and zircon. The Taessa lavas from this volcanic complex have a porphyritic texture. The volcanic rocks appear to ultimately derive from mantle plume melts, although a tectonic origin resulting from the convergence between African and Europe has also been suggested.

Eruptive history 

Volcanic activity in Atakor occurred 20-12 million years ago, 6.7 - 4.2 million years ago and 1.95 million years ago until today, with most volcanic activity taking place during the first episode in the Burdigalian and Serravallian. The second and the third volcanic phases were also accompanied by substantial ground uplift. Phonolite and trachyte erupted first and basalts later, although contrary to initial belief the flood basalts are from the oldest Tertiary, and the phonolitic-trachytic volcanism continued after the basaltic activity. Stratovolcanoes with lava flows are the most recent manifestations of activity in Atakor.

Activity continued in the Holocene, with lava flows covering Holocene features such as 10,000 years old lacustrine sediments, pottery and having a fresh appearance. Tuareg oral tradition of "fire mountains" appears to recount that Tuareg people observed eruptions. Local heat flow anomalies, rare fumaroles and observed seismicity are further evidence of ongoing volcanism.

Climate and history 

Atakor lies within the tropics (south of the Tropic of Cancer) and at high elevation. In the past, precipitation was considerably higher than today, such as during the Villafranchian and the Paleolithic when nivation landforms developed above  elevation, as well as moraines such as at Tahat and rock glaciers. A last wet period occurred during the Neolithic.

The volcanic field is used as a pasture.

References

Sources

Bibliography 
 
 

Geography of Algeria
Volcanic fields
Volcanoes of Algeria
Miocene volcanoes
Pliocene volcanoes
Pleistocene volcanoes
Holocene volcanoes
Geology of Algeria